Hans Walter Imhoff (25 February 1886 – 19 March 1971) was a Swiss professional footballer, who played as a striker.

Honours

Club 
Milan F.B.C.C.
Prima Categoria: 1907

External links 
Profile at MagliaRossonera.it 

1886 births
1971 deaths
Swiss men's footballers
Swiss expatriate footballers
Swiss expatriate sportspeople in Italy
Association football forwards
A.C. Milan players
Footballers from Basel